Keiyo District (also known as Elgeyo district or Elgeiyo) is a defunct administrative district in the former Rift Valley Province of Kenya. The district was formed in 1994, when Elgeyo/Marakwet-District was split into two - the other half was Marakwet District. Keiyo District had a population of 143.865 . Its capital was located in the Iten/Tambach town. In 2010, the districts were re-joined as Elgeyo-Marakwet County.

Local people are mostly of the Keiyo Tribe.  Many famous Kenyan runners come from the district, including Saif Saaeed Shaheen (born Stephen Cherono), Vivian Cheruiyot and Lornah Kiplagat. The area is used by local and foreign athletes for high-altitude training.

Mining of fluorite by the Kenya Fluorspar Company is the largest industry in the former district.

Local authorities 
Keiyo District has two local authorities: 
Iten/Tambach town (population: 31,813; urban population: 3,968)
Keiyo county council (population: 112,052; urban population: 1,868)

Administrative divisions

Constituencies 
The district had two constituencies: 
Keiyo North Constituency
Keiyo South Constituency

See also 
Kaptarakwa, a village in the Chapkorio division of Keiyo District
Kimwarer, a town in the Soy Division of Keiyo district

References

External links 
Kalenjin Online - Keiyo District
Keiyo Heritage - Keiyo District

 
Former districts of Kenya